Tonye Briggs-Oniyide is the current Rivers State Commissioner for Culture and Tourism. She was appointed in 2015 by Governor Ezenwo Nyesom Wike, replacing Nnabuihe Imegwu.

Early life and education
Briggs was born in Port Harcourt with family roots in Akuku-Toru local government area of Rivers State. She attended the University of Port Harcourt for her undergraduate studies, earning a bachelor's degree in Biochemistry.

Career

Federal Character Commission
Briggs was appointed member of the Federal Character Commission by President Goodluck Jonathan on 9 July 2013. She assumed office on 17 August, representing Rivers State.

Culture and Tourism Ministry
On 18 December 2015, she assumed office as Rivers State Culture and Tourism Commissioner, taking over the helm of the ministry from Nnabuihe Imegwu. In April 2016, she facilitated a partnership between the Africa Film Academy and the Ministry of Culture and Tourism through a landmark agreement which secured Port Harcourt as host city for the 12th Africa Movie Academy Awards. She has been criticized for not doing enough for the Entertainment industry in Rivers State, with some quarters calling for her resignation. She was suspended by the governor of the state on 31 August 2016.

See also
List of people from Rivers State
Rivers State Tourism Development Agency

References

Living people
Culture in Rivers State
First Wike Executive Council
University of Port Harcourt alumni
Businesspeople from Port Harcourt
Commissioners of ministries of Rivers State
21st-century Nigerian women politicians
21st-century Nigerian politicians
Tourism ministers
Women government ministers of Nigeria
Year of birth missing (living people)